Before You Exit is an American pop rock band originally from Orlando, Florida, now based in Los Angeles, California. The band consists of brothers Connor, Riley, and Toby McDonough.

In August 2009, they self-released their debut EP, A Short Story Long. March 2011 saw the release of their second EP, Letting Go, and their third EP, I Like That, was released in February 2013. In July 2015, they released their single, "Model". Before You Exit's latest EP, All the Lights, was released on April 8, 2016. Since All the Lights, the band has released two singles, “Find Yourself” (in collaboration with Great Good Fine Ok) and “Strangers”, before releasing their first album, Love, Pain, & Retrospect in June 2019.

History

Formation and early years (2007–2008) 
Connor McDonough and Braiden Wood first met through their church youth group. Wood proposed the idea of starting a band, and introduced McDonough to Thomas Silvers, the three of them joining together to form the band. They added a fourth member who did not remain a part of the band. Riley then joined the band as the permanent fourth member. The band's original name was 'soulbinder39.' Wood's mother coined the name 'Before You Exit,' initially stylized in the form of texting lingo as 'B4UXIT' and later changed to the full grammatically correct spelling. Their name eventually became short for the band's motto, make a difference before you exit, which developed afterward.

2009–11
In 2009, they released their first EP, A Short Story Long. The first tour that the band took part in was All Time Low's 2010 My Small Package Tour, in which they became a supporting act in the middle of the tour. They also played a few shows on All Time Low's 2011 tour, the Dirty Work Tour.

In 2010, the band was featured in the music video for "Love Me or Let Me Go" by Avery, released on YouTube on November 11, 2010. Before You Exit also had a guest appearance in the official video for Stefanie Scott's "Girl I Used To Know," released via YouTube on October 20, 2011.

In 2011, the band released their second EP, Letting Go. Following the release was their own mini-headlining The Next Big Thing Tour in the fall of 2011.

2012–13
The band first released "End of the World" as single on January 10, 2012, before releasing a newer version of the song featuring the rapper, Anth, on December 21 of that year.

They were supporting acts in Allstar Weekend's All The Way Tour, alongside Hollywood Ending and The After Party. The band also auditioned for X Factor USA and made it through to the judges' houses round but dropped out because they realized that the competition wasn't for them. In August 2012, the band line up changed as Toby McDonough, younger brother of Connor and Riley, joined the group. Due to their growing success and recognition in South America, the band was invited to perform at Brazil's 2012 NoCapricho Festival.

February 2013 saw the release of their third EP, I Like That. They were on tour supporting Action Item in the Resolution Tour, along with Paradise Fears and Hello Highway to promote their newest songs.

The band was the only supporting act for the North American leg of English singer Olly Murs' Right Place Right Time Tour. During the summer of 2013, they appeared on Cody Simpson's Paradise Tour as a supporting act, along with Ryan Beatty. On August 17 and 18, they traveled to Singapore to close for The Color Run at Sentosa and to Malaysia on August 19 at Sunway Pyramid Mall. Throughout the years, the band's fame had also expanded to the Philippines where they performed in the Circuit Fest on May 25, 2013.

2014–present
In early 2014, live member Braiden Wood announced via Tumblr that he would resign from the band to take on a career as a solo artist.

Before You Exit released a music video for the newly recorded acoustic version of "Soldier" from their 2013 EP I Like That on February 12, 2014, via YouTube. On July 17, 2014, Before You Exit released their standalone single "Heart Like California", which was premiered during a live chat via Stageit in December 2013.

In March, the band began their own headlining tour, The Dangerous Tour, which visited 10 cities along the east coast and one show in Manila, Philippines in May. A new single, "Dangerous", was released on March 18, the first day of the Dangerous Tour. Opening acts included Spencer Sutherland, Plug in Stereo, and Macy Kate.  In June 2014, the band then went on to join the girl group Fifth Harmony on their Fifth Times A Charm Tour after opening for them at the House of Blues in Orlando earlier in the year.

On April 28, 2014, Before You Exit was selected to compete in the annual Macy's iHeartRadio Rising Star contest. After over 7 million votes total, the band was announced as the winner. Before You Exit received a slot at the annual iHeartRadio Music Festival lineup, which took place at MGM Grand Las Vegas, and was also awarded their own parade float on the Macy's Thanksgiving Day Parade.

2015 brought some changes regarding Before You Exit and their future as a band. Due to increased popularity, Before You Exit toured Europe for the first time performing 22 shows in January–February 2015 with Christina Grimmie. On July 7, 2015, Before You Exit announced on social media that they had signed their first record deal with RCA Records. The next day, they announced their new single "Model" which was released July 17, 2015. The "Model" music video premiered on VEVO on October 26, 2015.

During the summer of 2015, Before You Exit joined English band The Vamps on their American tour as a supporting act, alongside The Tide. The tour consisted of 12 shows across the United States from July 21–August 8, 2015.

On March 5, 2016, Before You Exit announced that they would be making their biggest announcement ever and a countdown timer was placed on their website. On March 11, 2016, at midnight, the band announced a new EP, All the Lights, featuring their singles "Model" and "When I'm Gone". The EP was released on April 8, 2016, and debuted at #1 on iTunes in the Philippines. On April 26, 2016, Before You Exit announced The All The Lights Tour, with Christina Grimmie and special guests, which would visit 11 cities and run from May 29–June 17, 2016. The final two shows were cancelled following the death of Grimmie on June 10, 2016. On December 14, 2016, they released "Clouds" as a tribute to their fallen friend.

Beginning on May 25, 2017, fans of the band noticed Before You Exit was no longer listed among RCA's recording artists on RCA's website. On May 26, all the videos on Before You Exit's VEVO channel were deleted and re-uploaded on the same day. Given these two occurrences, it was widely suspected that Before You Exit was dropped from the label, though as of yet there has not been any explanation or confirmation of these speculations on the part of either Before You Exit or RCA.

On May 26, 2017, the band released a single with Great Good Fine Ok entitled "Find Yourself". The official music video was released on YouTube on July 7, 2017.

On November 3, 2017, the band released their new single entitled "Strangers". On Twitter, lead singer Riley said the song is about "initial[ly] falling for someone" and learning everything about them, but when it ends, it's almost as if you never met, even though the feelings are still there.

The band has written songs with Alex Gaskarth of All Time Low, Patrick Stump of Fall Out Boy, Stephen Barker Liles of Love and Theft, and Dan Book and Alexei Misoul, producers who have worked with acts such as Hot Chelle Rae and The Summer Set. The band has said they draw inspiration from artists like Rascal Flatts, John Mayer, Maroon 5 and hope to one day write with them.

On October 6, 2018, the band announced via Twitter that their first album was complete, and they would be releasing it in three parts: Love, Pain and Retrospect. They stated in the message that the first single off the album was due to be released October 19. On October 19, the first single from the album, "Silence", was released. This also starts the beginning of the Love section of the album.

Members

Current members
 Connor Patrick McDonough (born November 18, 1993) - lead vocals , vocals, lead guitar, piano, keyboard, drums, production 
 Riley Thomas McDonough (born August 31, 1995) - lead vocals , bass guitar , vocals, guitar 
 Toby James McDonough (born January 21, 1998) – vocals, guitar, piano, keyboard

Former and live members
 Braiden Montgomery Wood (born September 2, 1993) – rhythm guitar, piano, keyboard 
 Thomas Christian Silvers (born September 8, 1993) – drums 
Braiden and Thomas are two of the founding members of Before You Exit. Braiden is no longer a part of the band and has released two solo EPs, Be Free, Be Strong (2014) and Noiz (2015).
Thomas did not perform on the summer 2015 tour with The Vamps.
 Chris Ganoudis – bass 
 Ryan SJ Wheeler – bass 
 Chris Kamrada – drums 
 Josh Barker – bass, back-up vocals 
Chris Ganoudis is a friend of the band and filled in as a live member during 2014 following Braiden's departure. Chris is a member of the band Like The Movies. Ryan Wheeler announced January 5, 2016, on social media that he would be taking a break from performing with Before You Exit to turn his focus towards his new band, Blame Candy.

Tours

Headlining
 2011 – October: The Next Big Thing Tour
 2014 – March, April and May: The Dangerous Tour
 2015 – January–February: Europe Tour with Christina Grimmie
 2016 – May–June: All the Lights Tour with Christina Grimmie
 2017 – February–March: Asia Tour 2017

Supporting
 2010 – October–November: All Time Low's My Small Package Tour
 2011 – March, April and May: All Time Low's Dirty Work Tour
 2012 – January–February: Allstar Weekend's All the Way Tour
 2013 – January–February: Action Item's Resolution Tour
 2013 – April–May: Olly Murs' Right Place Right Time Tour
 2013 – May, June and July: Cody Simpson's Paradise Tour
 2014 – June: Fifth Harmony's Fifth Times A Charm Tour
 2015 – July–August: The Vamps' North American Tour

Other appearances
 2013 – May 25: Circuit Fest – Manila, Philippines
 2014 – June: DigiTour NYC and Toronto (Canada)
 2014 – July–August: Run Around Tour
 2015 – January–February : First European Tour
 2016 – January 30: 3LOGYINMANILA, Philippines with The Vamps and many other artists

Discography

Album

Extended plays

Singles
"O' Silent Night" (November 25, 2011)
"End of the World" (January 10, 2012)
"What Makes You Beautiful" (One Direction cover) (2012)
"End of the World" featuring Anth (December 21, 2012)
"A Little More You" (2013) 
"I Like That" (2013) 
"Soldier" (February 10, 2014)
"Dangerous" (March 18, 2014) 
"Heart Like California" (July 17, 2014) 
"Model" (July 17, 2015)
"When I'm Gone" (March 11, 2016)
"Suitcase" (2016)
"Clouds" (December 14, 2016)
"Radiate" (2017)
"Find Yourself" (with Great Good Fine Ok) (May 26, 2017)
"Strangers" (November 3, 2017)
"Silence" (October 19, 2018)
"NUMB" [feat. Lash] (February 1, 2019)
"Same Sun" (July 17, 2020)

Official music videos
 "I Like That" (May 30, 2013)
 "Soldier" (February 12, 2014)
 "Dangerous" (March 22, 2014)
 "Model" (October 26, 2015)
 "When I'm Gone" (March 28, 2016)
 "Find Yourself" (July 7, 2017)
 "Silence" (January 13, 2019)
 "Sinking In" (April 14, 2019)
 "The Butterfly Effect" (July 22, 2019)

References

External links

2007 establishments in Florida
American pop music groups
Musical groups established in 2007
Musical groups from Orlando, Florida
Sibling musical trios